Rickie Calvin Harris (born May 15, 1943) is a former American football defensive back in the National Football League (NFL) for the Washington Redskins and the New England Patriots.  He played college football at the University of Arizona.

In December 1966, Harris returned a punt for an NFL-record loss of 28 yards.

See also 
 List of NCAA major college yearly punt and kickoff return leaders

References

1943 births
Living people
Players of American football from St. Louis
American football defensive backs
Arizona Wildcats football players
Florida Blazers players
Washington Redskins players
New England Patriots players